Michael Driscoll is an American politician who serves as a Democratic member of the Philadelphia City Council, representing the 6th district since 2022. Prior to that, he served in the Pennsylvania House of Representatives representing the 173rd district.

Early life 
Driscoll was born in Philadelphia, Pennsylvania.

Political career

Pennsylvania House of Representatives 
Driscoll served as a member of the Pennsylvania House of Representatives for the 173rd district from 2015 to 2022.

Philadelphia City Council 
Driscoll sought a seat on the Philadelphia City Council for the 6th district after Councilman Bobby Henon had been convicted on federal bribery charges. He was sworn in on June 10, 2022.

References

External links 
PA House profile
Official party website

1960 births
Living people
Philadelphia City Council members
Democratic Party members of the Pennsylvania House of Representatives
21st-century American politicians